The Liberal Reform Group, later known as the Australian Reform Movement, was a minor Australian political party and predecessor to the Australia Party, which in turn was a predecessor to the Australian Democrats. It was founded by Gordon Barton, transport entrepreneur Ken Thomas, shark meshing contractor Nickolai Gorshenin, writer Kenneth Cook and a number of disaffected members of the Liberal Party, alienated by the Liberals' support for conscription in the Vietnam War. After contesting the 1966 federal election as the Liberal Reform Group, the party contested the 1967 Senate election as the Australian Reform Movement, but had become the Australia Party by 1969.

History
The Liberal Reform Group originated from a newspaper advertisement placed by IPEC managing director Gordon Barton on 3 November 1966, calling for "independent Liberal" candidates to contest the upcoming federal election on a platform of opposition to conscription and the Vietnam War. The new group was immediately attacked by Prime Minister Harold Holt and Treasurer William McMahon as pro-socialist and a front for the Australian Labor Party (ALP). However, the president of its Victorian branch subsequently announced that it would support the Coalition government on domestic issues. The party's policy speech was delivered by journalist Francis James, who stood against McMahon in the seat of Lowe.

At the 1966 federal election, the Liberal Reform Group nominated candidates only in New South Wales and Victoria, primarily in government-held seats. The Liberal Party unsuccessfully took out an injunction against the group's how-to-vote cards, claiming they were misleading as the word "Reform" was less visible than the word "Liberal".

By October 1967, the Liberal Reform Group was using the name "Australian Reform Movement" (ARM). A Canberra branch of the movement was formed in April 1969. On 20 July 1969, following discussions which had begun the previous month, it was announced that the ARM would merge with the supporters of independent senator Reg Turnbull to form a new political party, the Australia Party, with Turnbull as its leader and sole parliamentary representative.

References

Defunct political parties in Australia
Political parties established in 1966
1966 establishments in Australia
Political parties disestablished in 1969
1969 disestablishments in Australia